Aparaadhini is a 1968 Indian Malayalam-language film, directed by P. Bhaskaran and produced by B. S. Ranga. The film stars Sathyan, Sharada, Ambika and Padmini. The film had musical score by M. B. Sreenivasan.

Cast
 
Sathyan 
Sharada 
Ambika 
Padmini 
Sukumari 
Adoor Bhasi 
Thikkurissy Sukumaran Nair 
Shobha 
Bahadoor 
C. A. Balan

Soundtrack
The music was composed by M. B. Sreenivasan.

References

External links
 

1968 films
1960s Malayalam-language films
Films directed by P. Bhaskaran